Whitehall is an Australian novel by E. V. Timms. It is set in 1670.

It was republished in 1956 as The Falcon.

Plot
In 1670, Sir Richard Somerset fights wrongs under the name of "The Falcon". He is a patriotic member of the licentious court of Charles II and mistrustful of French patronage and influence at court.

References

External links
Copy of complete novel
Whitehall at AustLit

1931 Australian novels
Australian historical novels
Novels set in London
Fiction set in 1670
Angus & Robertson books
Novels set in the 1670s